Muthuveerakandiampatti is a village in the Thanjavur taluk of Thanjavur district, Tamil Nadu, India.

Demographics 
At the 2001 census, Muthuveerakandiampatti had a total population of 1,014 (511 males and 503 females). The sex ratio was 984. The literacy rate was 72.91%.

References 
 

Villages in Thanjavur district